ABT-510 is a molecular therapeutic drug that was the subject of research as a potential treatment for cancer. According to the Journal of Clinical Oncology, ABT-510 is a "subcutaneously (SC) administered nonapeptide thrombospondin analogue."

Following inconclusive phase I clinical trials, a 2007 phase II study of ABT-510 for treatment of metastatic melanoma failed to reach its primary endpoint resulting in termination of the study.  Only three out of twenty-one patients reached the primary endpoint of progression-free survival at 18 weeks, but these three patients remained progression-free for 21, 34, and 42 weeks.  However, biomarker data collected during this study showed a decrease in VEGF-C, circulating endothelial cells, and CD146 and CD34/133 counts, and a maximum tolerated dose has still not been established. Further study could consider a higher dose and/or combination treatment.

References

Angiogenesis inhibitors